Below are the results of Irish republican parties in elections to the House of Commons of the Parliament of Northern Ireland from its creation in 1921, until its abolition in 1972. Also includes a list of those elected.

|}
Total electorate: 582,464; turnout: 88.0% (512,842).
Elected: 
Armagh – Michael Collins
Down – Éamon de Valera
Fermanagh and Tyrone – Arthur Griffith, Seán Milroy, Seán O'Μahony
Londonderry – Eoin MacNeill

|}
Electorate 611,683 (512,264 in contested seats); Turnout: 75.1% (384,745).
Elected:
Armagh – Eamon Donnelly
Down – Éamon de Valera

|}

|}
Electorate 793,952 (250,519 in contested seats); Turnout 67.7% (169,690).
Elected:
South Armagh – Paddy McLogan (Independent Republican)
South Down – Éamon de Valera (Fianna Fáil)

|}

|}
Electorate: 845,964 (509,098 in contested seats); Turnout: 70.3% (357,882).
Elected:
Belfast Falls – Harry Diamond

|}
The only Socialist Republican Party candidate was elected unopposed. Electorate 846,719 (477,354 in contested seats); Turnout 79.3% (378,458).
Belfast Falls – Harry Diamond

|}
Electorate 888,352 (428,216 in contested seats); Turnout 60.2% (257,924).
Elected:
Belfast Falls – Harry Diamond

|}
Electorate: 891,064 (359,816 in contested seats); Turnout: 67.1% (241,501).
Elected:
Belfast Falls – Harry Diamond

|}
Electorate: 903,596 (458,838 in contested seats); Turnout: 66.0% (302,681).
Elected:
Belfast Falls – Harry Diamond

|}
Electorate: 907,667 (563,252 in contested seats); Turnout: 57.6% (324,589).
Elected:
Belfast Dock – Gerry Fitt
Belfast Falls – Harry Diamond

|}
Electorate: 912,087 (778,031 in contested seats); Turnout: 71.9% (559,087).
Elected:
Belfast Dock – Gerry Fitt
Belfast Central – Paddy Kennedy

See also
Parliament of Northern Ireland
House of Commons of Northern Ireland
Irish Republicanism in Northern Ireland

References
Archive.org – Northern Ireland House of Commons Election Results

Republican
Irish republicanism